The following is a list of bands that have been associated with the straight edge subculture. Note that not all of these bands have or had all straight edge members, and some of them stopped identifying as such at some point during their careers.

List of straight edge bands

See also 
List of people who follow a straight edge lifestyle

References

Citations

Bibliography 

 
Lists of punk bands